Memory unit may refer to:

 A computer memory component or device.
 Xbox 360 memory units, flash-based memory devices

See also
 Memory cards in video game consoles